Huh Soon-Young (born September 28, 1975 in Busan) is a South Korean handball player who competed in the 1996 Summer Olympics, in the 2000 Summer Olympics, and in the 2004 Summer Olympics.

In 1996 she was part of the South Korean team which won the silver medal. She played one match. Four years later she was part of the South Korean team which finished fourth in the 2000 Olympic tournament. She played all seven matches and scored 17 goals. In 2004, she won the silver medal with the South Korean team again. She played all seven matches and scored 21 goals.

External links
Profile

1975 births
Living people
South Korean female handball players
Olympic handball players of South Korea
Handball players at the 1996 Summer Olympics
Handball players at the 2000 Summer Olympics
Handball players at the 2004 Summer Olympics
Handball players at the 2008 Summer Olympics
Olympic silver medalists for South Korea
Olympic bronze medalists for South Korea
Olympic medalists in handball
Medalists at the 2008 Summer Olympics
Medalists at the 2004 Summer Olympics
Asian Games medalists in handball
Handball players at the 1998 Asian Games
Handball players at the 2002 Asian Games
Handball players at the 2006 Asian Games
Handball players at the 2010 Asian Games
Medalists at the 1996 Summer Olympics
Asian Games gold medalists for South Korea
Asian Games bronze medalists for South Korea
Medalists at the 1998 Asian Games
Medalists at the 2002 Asian Games
Medalists at the 2006 Asian Games
Medalists at the 2010 Asian Games
Sportspeople from Busan